Jonni is a given name. Notable people with the name include:

 Jonni Darkko (21st century), American pornographic actor
 Jonni Fulcher (born 1974), Scottish-Swiss billiards player
 Jonni Future, a fictional character
 Jonni Myyrä (1892-1955), Finnish athlete

See also

 John (given name)
 Johnie
 Johnn
 Johnny (given name)
 Johny (disambiguation)
 Jonathan (name)
 Joni (disambiguation)
 Jonie
 Jonn
 Jonnie
 Jony

English masculine given names
English unisex given names
Unisex given names